Kim Young-kwang (born 28 June 1983) is a South Korean footballer who plays for Seongnam FC as a goalkeeper.

Career
In December 2006 he transferred to Ulsan Hyundai Horang-i in a deal reportedly worth around $2.2m

International career
He was part of the South Korea 2004 Olympic football team, who finished second in Group A, making it through to the next round, before being defeated by silver medal winners Paraguay. He also capped for South Korea U-20 team at 2003 FIFA World Youth Championship. He was part of the Korean squad for the 2006 FIFA World Cup.

Club career statistics

International clean sheets
Results list South Korea's goal tally first.

Honours
Ulsan Hyundai
 AFC Champions League (1): 2012

References

External links
 

1983 births
Living people
Sportspeople from South Jeolla Province
Association football goalkeepers
South Korean footballers
South Korea under-20 international footballers
South Korea under-23 international footballers
South Korea international footballers
Jeonnam Dragons players
Ulsan Hyundai FC players
Gyeongnam FC players
Seoul E-Land FC players
K League 1 players
K League 2 players
2006 FIFA World Cup players
2010 FIFA World Cup players
Footballers at the 2004 Summer Olympics
Olympic footballers of South Korea
Footballers at the 2006 Asian Games
Asian Games competitors for South Korea